The Euler is an edge jump in figure skating. The Euler jump was known as the half loop jump in International Skating Union (ISU) regulations prior to the 2018/19 season when the name was changed. In Europe, the Euler is also called the Thorén jump, after its inventor, Swedish figure skater Per Thorén, who won a bronze medal at the 1908 Olympics in London. It is also a jump used in artistic roller skating. The etymology of the term "Euler" is not known.

The Euler is executed when a skater takes off from the back outside edge of one skate and lands on their opposite foot and edge. It is most commonly done prior to the third jump during a three-jump combination and serves as a way to put a skater on the correct edge in order to attempt a Salchow jump or a flip jump. It can only be accomplished as a single jump. According to U.S. Figure Skating, two benefits of the name change are that it simplifies the notation system for judges and makes it easier for skaters to attempt three-jump combinations, even if single loop jumps are already a planned part of their programs or if they accidentally pop out of a previous loop jump. The Euler has a base point value of 0.50 points, when used in combination with two listed jumps, and also becomes a listed jump.

References

Figure skating elements
Jumping sports